Shansky is a rural locality (a village) in Kananikolsky Selsoviet, Zilairsky District, Bashkortostan, Russia. The population was 203 as of 2010. There are 3 streets.

Geography 
Shansky is located 93 km north of Zilair (the district's administrative centre) by road. Kananikolskoye is the nearest rural locality.

References 

Rural localities in Zilairsky District